Pandanus taveuniensis is a species of plant in the family Pandanaceae. It is endemic to Fiji.

References

Endemic flora of Fiji
taveuniensis
Vulnerable plants
Taxonomy articles created by Polbot